Buck Branch is a stream in Hickman County, Tennessee, in the United States. It is a tributary of Duck River.

History
Buck Branch was named from the fact many bucks were shot there by early hunters.

See also
List of rivers of Tennessee

References

Rivers of Hickman County, Tennessee
Rivers of Tennessee